The 2008–09 Munster Rugby season was Munster's eighth season competing in the Celtic League, alongside which they also competed in the Heineken Cup. It was Tony McGahan's first season as Director of Rugby.

2008–09 squad

Pre-season

2008–09 Celtic League

2008–09 Heineken Cup

Pool 1

Quarter-final

Semi-final

References

External links
2008–09 Munster Rugby season official site 

2008–09
2008–09 Celtic League by team
2008–09 in Irish rugby union
2008–09 Heineken Cup by team